In France, a subprefecture is the commune which is the administrative centre of a departmental arrondissement that does not contain the prefecture for its department. The term also applies to the building that houses the administrative headquarters for an arrondissement.

The civil servant in charge of a subprefecture is the subprefect, assisted by a general secretary. Between May 1982 and February 1988, subprefects were known instead by the title Deputy Commissionner of the Republic (commissaire adjoint de la République). Where the administration of an arrondissement is carried out from a prefecture, the general secretary to the prefect carries out duties equivalent to those of the subprefect.

The municipal arrondissements of Paris, Lyon and Marseille are divisions of the commune rather than the prefecture. They are not arrondissements in the same sense.

See also
Prefectures in France
List of subprefectures of France
List of arrondissements of France

References

 
Sous-prefecture

fr:Sous-préfecture
oc:Sosprefectura
sv:Sous-préfecture